The Jong or Taia river is a river flowing through Sierra Leone. It passes by the city of Mattru Jong, and flows into the Atlantic Ocean via some deltas.

References

Rivers of Sierra Leone